The following radio stations broadcast on AM frequency 530 kHz:

Argentina
 Somos Radio in Buenos Aires

Canada

Broadcasting status copied from Wikipedia articles on specific stations.

 CHLO in Brampton (Greater Toronto Area), Ontario 
 CIRS in Sault Ste. Marie, Ontario, off-air since 2010.
 CKML in Chalk River, Ontario, license not renewed in 2012.
 CFHS in Fort Frances, Ontario, broadcasting status unknown.

Cuba
These stations can be heard in large parts of the southeastern U.S. at night, interfering with each other.
 "Radio Enciclopedia, CMBR,  La Habana 
Radio Rebelde (call signs unknown) in Isla de Juventud and Guantánamo

United States
All U.S.-based radio stations on 530 operate as travelers' information stations. A detailed list of all currently licensed stations can be queried at the FCC Website.Note: In large parts of North America, the morse code LYQ (.-.. -.-- --.-) can be heard on this frequency. It originates from a non-directional beacon in Manchester, Tennessee on 529 kHz.''

References

External links 
List of radio stations on 530 kHz - mwlist.org

Lists of radio stations by frequency